George Pearson may refer to:

George Pearson (doctor) (1751–1828), English physician and chemist
George Pearson (filmmaker) (1875–1973), English film director, producer and screenwriter
George Sharratt Pearson (1880–1966), politician in British Columbia, Canada
George Pearson (cricketer) (1921–1983), English cricketer
George Pearson Centre (1952–present), a residential care facility in Vancouver, British Columbia, Canada
George F. Pearson (1799–1867), rear admiral in the United States Navy
Mel Pearson (ice hockey, born 1938) (1938–1999), Canadian ice hockey player
George Pearson (footballer) (1907–unknown), English footballer